A by-election was held for the New South Wales Legislative Assembly electorate of Central Cumberland on 21 November 1885 because of the resignation of John Lackey who was appointed to the Legislative Council.

Dates

Result

				

The by-election was caused by the resignation of John Lackey who was appointed to the Legislative Council.

See also
Electoral results for the district of Central Cumberland
List of New South Wales state by-elections

References

1885 elections in Australia
New South Wales state by-elections
1880s in New South Wales